Karkottai is a 1954 Indian Tamil-language film produced and directed by Kemparaj Urs. The film stars Kemparaj Urs and Krishna Kumari. It is based on the 1844 novel The Count of Monte Cristo by Alexandre Dumas.

Cast and crew 
The lists of Cast and Crew are adapted from the database of Film News Anandan.

Cast 
Kemparaj Urs
Krishna Kumari
K. Sarangapani
B. R. Panthulu
M. V. Rajamma
Jayalakshmi
Sandhya
B. Jayamma

Crew 
Producer: Kemparaj Urs
Director: Kemparaj Urs
Dialogues: V. Gopalan, S. R. Krishna Aiyangar
Cinematography: Madhur
Editing: Paul, G. Yadav
Art: Vardhukar
Choreography: Hiralal

Production 
Karkottai was based on The Count of Monte Cristo by Alexandre Dumas. It was also produced in Kannada under the title Jaladurga.

Soundtrack 
Music was composed by S. V. Venkatraman and G. Ramanathan while the lyrics were penned by Srimathi Rajeswary. List of songs is given below.

Songs
 "O! Kappalottu Thamizhaa"
 "Naan Ingu Thaniyaaga, Nee Angu Thaniyaaga"
 "Inbamaa, Nee Thunbamaa"
 "Kovilukku Odiduvaar Govinda"
 "Avan Seyyum Leelaikku"

References

Bibliography

External links 

Indian historical films
Indian adventure films
Indian multilingual films
Films based on The Count of Monte Cristo
Films scored by S. V. Venkatraman
Films scored by G. Ramanathan
1950s historical adventure films
1950s multilingual films
Indian black-and-white films